The Sony Xperia ZR (models C5502 and C5503 for LTE support), also known as Sony Dogo, is a touchscreen-enabled, HD Android flagship smartphone designed, developed, and marketed by Sony Mobile.

The smartphone was announced by Sony at CES 2013 and was released on 17 May 2013 in Japan. The Xperia ZR was initially shipped with Android 4.1.2 (Jelly Bean) and has eventually been updated to Android 5.1.1 (Lollipop). The smartphone has Ingress Protection Ratings of IP55 and IP58, making it dust protected, low pressure water jet protected, and waterproof. Sony's internal test showed that there is no water intrusion after testing Xperia ZR in 1.5-metre of water for 30 minutes. Xperia ZR also features a 13 MP IMX135 Exmor RS camera sensor as well as an HD (720 x 1280 pixels) display, encompassed in Sony's Industrial 'Omni-Balance' Design.

The Xperia ZR was received positively in Japan where it is marketed as Sony Xperia A (SO-04E). In September 2013 carrier NTT DoCoMo released a limited edition of the A called "Xperia feat. Hatsune Miku."

See also
 Sony Xperia Z series

References

External links

Android (operating system) devices
Mobile phones introduced in 2013
Discontinued smartphones
Sony smartphones